Algeria's lone athlete competed in the Summer Olympic Games for the first time at the 1964 Summer Olympics in Tokyo, Japan.

Gymnastics

Men's individual all-around

References
Official Olympic Reports

Nations at the 1964 Summer Olympics
1964
Olympics